Bilateral relations between Russia and Thailand date to the late nineteenth century, when the Russian Tsar Nicholas II and King Chulalongkorn (Rama V) of Siam (as Thailand was then known) formed a friendly personal relationship. The two countries exchanged legations in 1897–1898, and signed a Treaty of Friendship and Maritime Navigation in 1899. Diplomatic relations were terminated following the Russian Revolution in 1917, and re-established between the Soviet Union and Thailand on March 12, 1941; Thailand recognized Russian Federation as the successor to Soviet Union on December 28, 1991.  Russia has an embassy in Bangkok and two honorary consulates in Phuket and Pattaya. Thailand has an embassy in Moscow and two honorary consulates (in Saint Petersburg and Vladivostok).  Both countries are full members of APEC and the Organization for Security and Co-operation in Europe (Russia is a participating state and Thailand is a partner).

The first recorded contact between Russians and Siam was on 19 February 1863, when the ships Gaydamak and  Novik arrived at Bangkok. Close relations between Thailand's aristocratic families and the Russian Empire ensued, with a well-documented friendship between Chulalongkorn and Nikolas II. Chakrabongse Bhuvanath, the 40th child of Chulalongkorn, was later to marry Ekaterina Desnitskaya, whom he met while studying in the Russian Empire.

Economic ties

Bilateral trade
Official figures of trade volume published by two countries contradict each other.
 According to Thai sources, trade with Russia in 2008 reached 2.11 billion US dollars; Thailand has a trade deficit of 1.76 billion US dollars. Russia exports mineral resources, while Thailand exports auto parts, electronics and foodstuffs.
 According to Russian customs service, Russian exports to Thailand in 2008 amounted to 1.23 billion, imports to 1.49 billion, leaving Russia with a deficit of 254 million US dollars. In total, trade with Thailand is only 0.4% of Russian foreign trade. According to Russian embassy in Bangkok, Thailand is Russia's largest trading partner in South-eastern Asia and third largest buyer of Russian ferrous metals worldwide.

As recently as in 2002, Russia had a significant trade deficit and imported significant (up to half a million metric tons p.a.) amounts of Thai rice. In 2005 Russia imposed prohibitive protectionist tariffs on rice, then an embargo on Thai rice and a full ban on imports of Thai rice in 2007, citing pest infection.

In 2004 Thailand approached Russian authorities about the prospects of buying 12 Su-30 jet fighters. Thai chicken industry, weakened by avian influenza crisis, enthusiastically backed the deal, betting on reciprocal easing of Russian food import regime, but the deal never materialized. In October 2008 Thai Prime Minister Somchai Wongsawat agreed to purchase Russian Mi-17 military helicopters, breaking with dependence on American weapons, however his government was ousted two months later.

On May 21, 2022, Russian Deputy Prime Minister and Commerce Minister Jurin Laksanawisit announced that Russia has pledged to support the goal of raising annual bilateral trade to US$10 billion from US$2.7 billion in 2021. Russia is looking to buy mainly food products, rice, fruits, automobiles and auto parts from Thailand. Russia also wants to increase investment of information technology in Thailand, as many Russian investors have set up base in Rayong's Amata industrial estate.

Tourism
Thailand is one of the major tropical destinations for tourists from Russia. However, numbers provided by the Thai authorities are contested by Russians as artificially inflated, and Thai authorities contest that Russian numbers are too small:
 Russian border guards reported 259,000 departures to Thailand in 2008 (235,000 in 2007). Turkey, the most common destination, accounts for 2.2 million departures. Thai government sources noted that the Russian number includes only direct flights, leaving out tourists that fly with stopovers elsewhere and reported 279,000 Russian tourists for 2007.
 Thai tourist service reported 456,972 Russian "tourist visits" to Pattaya alone in January–March 2007 (of a total of 1.57 million). Russian commentators note that Thais actually counted hotel nights and their number should be divided by a factor of 10 to 11.

In 2018, it is estimated that 1.5 million Russians visited Thailand, a 15% increase from 2017. On average, about 20,000 Thais visit Russia per year.

See also
Foreign relations of Russia
Foreign relations of Thailand

References

External links

  Documents on the Russia–Thailand relationship at the Russian Ministry of Foreign Affairs
St. Petersburg's Man in Siam: A.E. Olarovskii and Russia's Asian Mission, 1898-1905

Diplomatic missions
  Embassy of Russia in Bangkok
   Embassy of Thailand in Moscow

 
Thailand
Bilateral relations of Thailand